Tammi Wilson Uluinayau (born 29 September 1973) is a New Zealand former rugby union player. She represented the New Zealand women's national rugby union team, the Black Ferns, at the 1998 and 2002 Women's Rugby World Cup.

Wilson was born in Christchurch and was the only girl in a family of nine. She attended Auckland Girls' Grammar School. She had previously represented New Zealand in touch and rugby league before making the Black Ferns.

Wilson was a member of the first official New Zealand women's sevens team, who took part in the 2000 Hong Kong Sevens. In 2001, she played in the two test series for the Black Ferns against .

Wilson also played Rugby League for New Zealand in 1995, playing in the inaugural Test Match series against Australia.

References

External link
Black Ferns Profile

1973 births
Living people
New Zealand women's international rugby union players
New Zealand female rugby union players
Female rugby union players
New Zealand women's international rugby sevens players